Jaani may refer to:

 Baba Jaani Shah, Muslim Pir who accepted the Sikh Dharma
 Jaani, Estonia, a village in western Estonia
 Jaani (film), a romance film
 Johnny, a Tamil film (Johnny pronounced in Tamil as Jaani)

People with the name
 Jaani (songwriter), Indian songwriter from Punjab
 Jaani Peuhu (born 1978), Finnish musician
 Getter Jaani (born 1993), Estonian singer and actress
 Karin Jaani (1952–2009), Estonian diplomat and politician
 Kristian Jaani (born 1976), Estonian police officer and politician

See also
Jyani (disambiguation)
Janis (disambiguation)
Jaani (disambiguation)

Estonian-language surnames